The eighth HMS Worcester (D96, later I96), was a Modified W-class destroyer of the British Royal Navy that saw service in World War II. She later served as an accommodation ship as the second HMS Yeoman.

Construction and commissioning

Worcester was ordered in April 1918 as part of the 13th Order of the 1917-1918 Naval Programme. She was laid down on 20 December 1918 by J. Samuel White at Cowes, Isle of Wight, and launched on 24 October 1919. After launching, she was transferred to the Royal Navy Dockyard at Portsmouth for fitting out, and was completed there on 20 September 1922. She was commissioned into service the same day with the pennant number D96.

Service history

Before World War II
After entering service with the fleet in 1922, Worcester saw service in the Atlantic Fleet and Mediterranean Fleet before being decommissioned, transferred to the Reserve Fleet, and placed in reserve at Portsmouth in the early 1930s.

In 1939, Worcester was selected for recommissioning as the fleet mobilised because of deteriorating diplomatic relations between the United Kingdom and Nazi Germany.

World War II

1939–40
She remained on these duties until May 1940, when the German invasion of the Netherlands, Belgium, Luxembourg, and France began and she came under the Commander-in-Chief, Dover to support the evacuation of Allied personnel from Europe as German ground forces advanced. On 24 May, she was assigned to Operation Dynamo, the evacuation of Allied troops from Dunkirk, France, during which she made six trips to the Dunkirk beaches, transported a total of 4,350 troops to the United Kingdom, and suffered damage in a German air attack on 27 May 1940.

Worcester was under repair during June 1940 – the month in which her pennant number was changed to I96 – but in July 1940 she returned to service with the 16th Destroyer Flotilla, now based at Harwich, for convoy escort and patrol operations in the North Sea. In August 1940 she was transferred to Western Approaches Command for convoy defence duty in the Western Approaches, which she continued without major incident through the end of 1940.

1941–42

In January 1941, Worcester transferred back to the 16th Destroyer Flotilla at Harwich for more North Sea convoy escort and patrol work, this time with Whitshed and the destroyer leader  and destroyer . In March 1941, she and Whitshed escorted Convoy FS 29, which was steaming south along the east coast of Great Britain and came under German air attack on 6 March. On 7 March, she and Whitshed chased a German motor torpedo boat – an S-boat, known to the Allies as an "E-boat" – which had been detected near the convoy; the two destroyers were unable to make contact with it. Unfortunately for the convoy, the E-boat had been serving as a decoy for the German 1st S-Boote (E-boat) Flotilla, which attacked the convoy when Worcester and Whitshed were too far away to intervene. The Germans penetrated the remaining escort – reduced to only the escort destroyer  and the patrol sloop  – to sink two of FS 29s merchant ships.

Worcester continued her escort and patrol duties without significant incident until February 1942, when her flotilla was put on alert for the possibility that the German battlecruisers Scharnhorst and Gneisenau and heavy cruiser Prinz Eugen  would attempt a breakout from Brest in German-occupied France to move to a port in Germany. In preparation for opposing such a breakout, Worcester, Mackay, Walpole, and Whitshed were conducting exercises with the destroyer leader  and destroyer  of the 21st Destroyer Flotilla to practise torpedo attacks against enemy ships when they received word on 12 February 1942 that the German ships were indeed steaming to Germany via the English Channel, Strait of Dover, and North Sea in what was to become known as the "Channel Dash." The British ships were ordered to attack the German naval force. During her unsuccessful torpedo attack, Worcester was hit by 11-inch (280-mm) shells from the battlecruisers and 8-inch (203-mm) shells from Prinz Eugen, suffering 26 killed or mortally wounded and 45 injured. Most of the dead are buried side by side at Shotley Naval Cemetery, opposite Worcester's Harwich moorings. The German gunfire inflicted severe structural damage on Worcester, starting fires, flooding her No. 1 boiler room, and causing her to go dead in the water. Her surviving crew managed to put out her fires, get back underway, and proceed to Parkeston Quay (Harwich) for repairs without the aid of tugs.

Nominated for conversion to a Short-Range Escort, Worcester was under repair and conversion until August 1942. Returning to service in September 1942, she was assigned to the Home Fleet at Scapa Flow in the Orkney Islands to support Arctic convoys during their voyages between the United Kingdom and the Kola Inlet in the Soviet Union. She detached from QP 14 on 26 September.

Worcester remained with the Home Fleet through December 1942.

1943–45

In January 1943, Worcester was released from duty with the Home Fleet. She returned to the 16th Destroyer Flotilla at Harwich and in February 1943 resumed operations in the North Sea, escorting convoys and conducting interception patrols targeting German E-boats before they could launch attacks against Allied convoys. On 24 October 1943, she deployed off Norfolk, England, with Mackay and small craft of the Royal Navy Coastal Forces to intercept E-boats thought to be gathering for an attack on Convoys FN 1160 and FS 1164, steaming northbound and southbound, respectively, in the North Sea along the east coast of Great Britain. Worcester, Mackay, and the Coastal Forces craft engaged E-boats of the German 4th Torpedo Boat Flotilla on 25 October 1943 off Cromer, preventing them from attacking the convoys; four of the E-boats did not return to base at IJmuiden in the Netherlands.

Worcester continued her escort and interception operations until 23 December 1943 when she detonated a mine in the North Sea near Smith's Knoll. The mine destroyed her stern structure, and she was towed to Great Yarmouth. She was under repair and survey until April 1944, when she was deemed beyond economical repair and was decommissioned.

In May 1944, Worcester was selected for use as an accommodation ship in London upon completion of repairs and modification for her new role. In January 1945 she was towed to London, and after local preparation for use as an accommodation ship, was recommissioned with the new name HMS Yeoman, the second Royal Navy ship of the name, in June 1945. She remained in service as such after the surrender of Japan brought World War II to an end in August 1945.

Decommissioning and disposal

Yeoman remained in use as an accommodation ship until placed on the disposal list in 1946. She was sold for scrapping on 17 September 1946 to the British Iron & Steel Corporation (BISCO), which allocated her to Thos. W. Ward to be broken up. She was towed to the shipbreakers yard at Grays, Essex, England, in February 1947.

Notes

Bibliography
 
 
 
 
 
 
 
 
 
 
 
 
 
 

 

V and W-class destroyers of the Royal Navy
1919 ships
Ships built on the Isle of Wight
World War II destroyers of the United Kingdom
Maritime incidents in December 1943